Kirkkonummi railway station is a railway station in the municipality of Kirkkonummi, Finland, between Siuntio railway station and Tolsa railway station.

Kirkkonummi railway station serves as the terminus for the U and most L trains of the Helsinki commuter rail system and is also served by Y, X and L trains to Siuntio. Most of the long-distance trains between Helsinki and Turku used to stop at Kirkkonummi station until 2016. Nowadays only some few long-distance services make a stop at Kirkkonummi. The station has also three VR bus departures to Karis via Ingå on weekdays.

Connections
 Y trains (Helsinki-Siuntio, skip-stop)
 U trains (Helsinki-Kirkkonummi)
 L trains (Helsinki-Kirkkonummi (-Siuntio, one daily return), night-time and early morning)
 X trains (Helsinki-Siuntio)
 A few of the long-distance services between Helsinki and Turku

Departure tracks 
There are three platform tracks at the Kirkkonummi railway station used by the passenger trains.

 Track 1 is the departure track for westbound long-distance trains towards Turku, Y, X and L trains to Siuntio and some of the U and L trains to Helsinki.
 Track 2 is the departure track for eastbound long-distance trains and Y and X trains towards Helsinki.
 Track 3 is used only by U and L line trains to Helsinki.

See also
 Railway lines in Finland

References

External links
 

Railway station
Railway stations in Uusimaa
Railway stations opened in 1903